In mathematics, a regular element of a Lie algebra or Lie group is an element whose centralizer has dimension as small as possible.

Basic case 

If the matrix  is diagonalisable, then it is regular if and only if there are  different eigenvalues. To see this, notice that  will commute with any matrix  that stabilises each of its eigenspaces.

Definition 
Let  be a finite-dimensional Lie algebra over an infinite field. For each , let

For example, since  for every x,  is nilpotent (i.e., each  is nilpotent by Engel's theorem) if and only if .

Let .

A Cartan subalgebra and a regular element 
Over an infinite field, a regular element can be used to construct a Cartan subalgebra, a self-normalizing nilpotent subalgebra. Over a field of characteristic zero, this approach constructs all the Cartan subalgebras.

Given an element , let

Thus,  and the equality holds if and only if  is a regular element.

The statement is then that if  is a regular element, then  is a Cartan subalgebra. Thus,  is the dimension of at least some Cartan subalgebra; in fact,  is the minimum dimension of a Cartan subalgebra. More strongly, over a field of characteristic zero (e.g.,  or ),
every Cartan subalgebra of  has the same dimension; thus,  is the dimension of an arbitrary Cartan subalgebra,
every Cartan subalgebra is of the form  for some regular element .

A regular element in a Cartan subalgebra of a complex semisimple Lie algebra 

This characterization is sometimes taken as the definition of a regular element (especially when only regular elements in Cartan subalgebras are of interest).

Notes

References

Lie groups
Lie algebras